The 1979 Purdue Boilermakers football team represented Purdue University in the 1979 Big Ten Conference football season. Led by third-year head coach Jim Young, the Boilermakers compiled an overall record of 10–2 with a mark of 7–1 in conference play, placing second in the Big Ten. Purdue was invited to the Astro-Bluebonnet Bowl, where the Boilermakers defeated  Tennessee. The team played home games at Ross–Ade Stadium in West Lafayette, Indiana.

Schedule

Starters
Offense: se Burrell/Ray Smith, lt Feil, lg Schwan, c Quinn, rg Hall, rt McKenzie, te Young, qb Herrmann, fb Augustyniak, tb Jones/McCall, fl Harris, k Seibel

Defense: de Kingsbury, lt Clark, mg Loushin, rt Jackson, de Turner, lb Motts/Looney/Marks, cb W. smith/Kay, ss Seneff, fs Williams/McKinnie, p Hayes

Roster

Staff
Head coach: Jim Young

Assistants: Bob Bockrath, Leon Burtnett, Mike Hankwitz, Randy Hart, Doug Redmann, Bob Spoo, Larry Thompson, Ed Zaunbrecher

Game summaries

Oregon
 Wally Jones 30 rushes, 156 yards

Illinois
 Mark Herrmann breaks Mike Phipps' school record for career passing yardage
 Dave Young 114 Rec Yds, 2 TD
 Jimmy Smith 23 rushes, 125 yards

at Michigan State

    
    
    

Mark Herrmann broke the Big Ten career completion record set by Michigan State's Ed Smith in the previous year.

at Iowa

Michigan

at Indiana

 Ben McCall 20 rushes, 148 yards

vs. Tennessee (Bluebonnet Bowl)

    
    
    
    
    
    
    

PUR: Mark Herrmann 21/39, 303 Yds, 3 TD 
PUR: Bart Burell 8 Rec, 144 Yds, TD

Statistics

Passing

Awards

All-Big Ten

 Calvin Clark (1st)
 Ken Loushin (1st)
 Steve McKenzie (1st)
 Dale Schwan (1st)
 Keena Turner (1st)
 Dave Young (1st)
 Mark Herrmann (2nd)
 Marcus Jackson (2nd)
 Kevin Motts (2nd)
 Pete Quinn (2nd)
 Wayne Smith (2nd)

References

Purdue
Purdue Boilermakers football seasons
Bluebonnet Bowl champion seasons
Purdue Boilermakers football